Génération·s is a French political party created on 1 July 2017 by Benoît Hamon who, according to its founder, aims to "refound and gather the left" in France. Sometimes rendered Génération-s or Génération·s , it was formerly named Mouvement du 1er Juillet (1 July Movement), and has also been known by the short name M1717. Its foundation followed the sharp decline of the Socialist Party in the 2017 presidential election, in which Hamon was the Socialist nominee, and the legislative elections, in which he lost his seat as deputy. The movement presents itself as an initiative to assemble the forces of the left in France.

The political ideologies it supports are European federalism, eco-socialism, and democratic socialism.

History 

According to its founder Hamon, the movement is "a totally open initiative" that seeks to "go beyond the party framework" and "converge" with other political figures that share its values. At the time of its founding, he announced his goal to unite the left before the 2019 European Parliament elections and the municipal elections in 2020, promoting an "Estates General of all the left to make a common house for the municipal elections of 2020". The party also aims to popularize ideas developed by Hamon during his presidential campaign that were abandoned by the party during the legislative campaign, such as universal basic income.

According to Hamon, 11,000 people participated in the creation of the movement. Prominent supporters included politicians Cécile Duflot and Yannick Jadot from Europe Ecology – The Greens (EELV), essayist Raphaël Glucksmann, journalist Edwy Plenel and economist Thomas Porcher.

Politicians joining the party included deputy Régis Juanico, former minister Dominique Bertinotti, MEP Guillaume Balas and former deputies Barbara Romagnan and Mathieu Hanotin.

In September 2017, the movement was invited to the Fête de l'Humanité, where it had its own stand beside that of Benoît Hamon. On the September 23rd, the movement took part in a protest march against the policies of Emmanuel Macron, which demonstrators described as a "social coup d'état". Hamon appeared publicly at the head of the procession alongside Jean-Luc Mélenchon of La France Insoumise, which organized the protest. On 2 October 2017, Laura Slimani, former president of the Young Socialists, left the Socialist Party to join the movement.

On 10 October 2017, a dozen regional councilors including Benoît Hamon left the socialist group of the regional council of Île-de-France to form a new group of about twenty advisers associating ecologists, called "Ecologist and Social Alternative". The same day, Pascal Cherki left the Socialist Party to join M1717.

On 2 December 2017, the new name "Génération·s" was chosen during the party's founding congress in Le Mans. During the congress, Hamon announced that he was preparing European-wide lists for the European Parliament election of 2019 with Yanis Varoufakis, the former Greek minister of finance and leader of DieM25.

In January 2018, the movement claimed to have reached 50,000 members and elected an interim direction.

Génération·s contested the 2019 European Parliament elections as part of DieM25, winning no seats and 3.27% of the popular vote.

Génération·s was part of NUPES for the 2022 French legislative election.

Election results

National Assembly

European Parliament

References

2017 establishments in France
Alter-globalization
Democratic socialist parties in Europe
Ecosocialist parties
Political parties established in 2017
Political parties of the French Fifth Republic
Political parties supporting universal basic income
Socialist parties in France
Pro-European political parties in France